Breast duct endoscopy is a method used to examine the lining of the lactiferous ducts to look for abnormal tissue. A very thin, flexible, lighted tube attached to a camera is inserted through the nipple, and threaded into the breast ducts deep in the breast. Tissue and fluid samples may be removed during the procedure.

References 
 Breast duct endoscopy entry in the public domain NCI Dictionary of Cancer Terms

Endoscopy
Breast cancer